Great Expectations: The Untold Story is a 1987 Australian film which was made as a feature film and a mini series.

It is based on an account of what happened to Magwitch from the novel Great Expectations when he was in Australia.

Plot
Magwitch is sentenced to life in New South Wales. He is put on a chain gang run by Solomon Tooth and eventually amasses a fortune.

Cast
John Stanton as Magwitch
Sigrid Thornton as Bridget
Robert Coleby as Compeyson
Anne Louise Lambert as Estella
Noel Ferrier as Jaggers
Ron Haddrick as Lankerton
Danny Simmons as Young Pip
Todd Boyce as Older Pip

Production
The film was the idea of Tom Burstall, who made it with his director father Tim. Tim Burstall says in the writing of it he was influenced by a book by Price Waring, Tales of the Old Convict System. It was filmed in Sydney from 9 March to 11 July 1986.

References

External links

Great Expectations: The Untold Story at Oz Movies
Great Expectations: The Untold Story at TCMDB
Great Expectations: The Untold Story at BFI

1980s Australian television miniseries
1987 Australian television series debuts
1987 Australian television series endings
1987 television films
Films based on Great Expectations
1987 films
English-language television shows
Television shows set in colonial Australia
1980s English-language films
Films directed by Tim Burstall
1980s Australian films